Association Sportive et Culturelle de Biesheim is a French football club from Biesheim, Haut-Rhin. Founded in 1968, it competes in the Championnat National 3, in the group F of the French football league system.

History
The team reached the last 32 of the Coupe de France in 2017–18 Coupe de France. There, it hosted Championnat National team Grenoble Foot 38 and lost 3–0 in a penalty shootout after a 2–2 draw on 24 January 2018.

Tournament sponsor PMU named Biesheim the "Petit Poucet" (Tom Thumb) of the competition and rewarded them with their kits for the last 32 match.

Current squad

References

1968 establishments in France
Association football clubs established in 1968
Football clubs in France
Sport in Haut-Rhin